The Croydon Football Club is an Australian rules football team, founded in 1906. It is based in the eastern suburbs of Melbourne, Victoria, Australia and is part of the Eastern Football League.

Senior club history
Formed in 1906, the club first played in competition in 1909. The club spent time in the Box Hill Reporter Football Association before transferring to the Ringwood District Football Association.

After World War II, the club founded the Croydon District Football League, which evolved into the Eastern District Football League.

The club was a foundation member of the Eastern Football League in 1962.

VFL/AFL players

References

Australian rules football clubs in Melbourne
Australian rules football clubs established in 1906
Eastern Football League (Australia) clubs
1906 establishments in Australia
Sport in the City of Maroondah